The Indiana Ice was a Tier I junior ice hockey team and member club of the United States Hockey League (USHL) that was formed in 2004 when the Danville Wings were purchased and moved from their location in Danville, Illinois, to Indianapolis, Indiana. The Ice captured the regular season division titles in the 2007–08 and 2013–14 seasons and won the 2009 and 2014 Clark Cup titles. Before the 2012–13 season, the Ice played their home games at the Indiana Farmers Coliseum. From 2012 to 2014, the Ice split their home games between the Bankers Life Fieldhouse and the Pan American Arena. The Ice played in the Eastern Conference/Division of the United States Hockey League.

The USHL has granted the team in dormancy status for the 2014–15 season while the organization focuses on development of a new facility. In January 2015, the USHL approved of the team's proposed future home, the Lyceum Pavilion, in the Indianapolis area. During this time, the Indiana Ice organization remained a member club in the USHL, with membership on its board and full rights to participate in the business and operations of the league. Since then, there have been no updates on the status of the team.

Season-by-season record

Season-by-season playoff record

2004–05: Lost to Cedar Rapids 3 games to none in quarterfinals; the RoughRiders eventually won the Clark Cup title.
2005–06: Lost to Cedar Rapids RoughRiders 3 games to 2 in quarterfinals; the Ice held a 2–1 series lead before losing the last 2 games.
2006–07: Swept Green Bay 4 games to 0 in first round; defeated Waterloo & Cedar Rapids in round-robin pool play in Round 2; lost to eventual Clark Cup Champion Sioux Falls 3–2 in O.T. in Clark Cup Semifinals
2007–08: Lost to Chicago 3 games to 1 in quarterfinals.
2008–09: Defeated Cedar Rapids 3 games to 2 in quarterfinals; defeated Green Bay 3 games to 1 in East Division Finals; defeated Fargo 3 games to 1 to win the Clark Cup Finals.
2009–10: Defeated the Cedar Rapids 3 games to 2 in quarterfinals; lost to Green Bay 3 games to 1 in East Division Finals
2010–11: Defeated the Waterloo 2 games to 0 in first round; lost to Green Bay 3 games to 0 in Eastern Quarterfinals
2011–12: Defeated Dubuque 3 games to 0 in Eastern Conference Semifinals; lost to Green Bay 3 games to 0 in conference finals
2013–14: Defeated Green Bay 3 games to 1 in quarterfinals; defeated Dubuque 3 games to 0 in Eastern Conference Finals; defeated Waterloo 3 games to 2 to win the Clark Cup Finals.

NHL draft picks
The following table shows NHL draft picks that have played for the Ice.  The tenure column indicates whether they were drafted while on the Ice roster, prior to arriving, or after moving on to college or major junior.

NHL Icemen
The following table shows Indiana Ice players that have made it to the NHL.

Head-to-head record
Through 2013–14 Season

Head coach history 

Coaching changes:
Dean Grillo replaced Red Gendron with seven games remaining in the 2004–05 season.
Jack Bowkus replaced Dean Grillo after thirty-four games in the 2005–06 season.
Scott McConnell served as interim head coach for the last two games of the 2006–07 season.
Charlie Skjodt took over at the start of the 2007 playoffs.
 5/13/08 – The Indiana Ice announced that head coach Charlie Skjodt had resigned as head coach to become the Indiana Ice's President of Hockey Operations
 5/14/08 – The Ice announced the hiring of Jeff Blashill as the new head coach of the Indiana Ice. Blashill was a former assistant coach at Miami University
 4/7/10 – Blashill is announced as the new head coach at Western Michigan University
 5/25/10 – The Ice announce the return of Charlie Skjodt to the head coach position
 5/5/11 – The Ice promote Charlie Skjodt to president of the club, vacating the head coach position.
 6/1/11 – Kyle Wallack is named head coach and general manager.  Wallack was previously associate head coach at Yale University.
 4/9/12 – Kyle Wallack relieved of duties.  Charlie Skjodt takes over head coaching duties.
 5/30/12 – Ron Gay promoted to head coach and general manager.
 12/4/12 – Jeff Brown hired as new head coach and GM.  Ron Gay reassigned.

References

External links
Indiana Ice Website 
United States Hockey League

Ice
United States Hockey League teams
Ice
2004 establishments in Indiana
Ice hockey clubs established in 2004